California's 51st State Assembly district is one of 80 California State Assembly districts. It is currently represented by Democrat Rick Zbur of Los Angeles.

District profile 
The district encompasses parts of western Los Angeles, as well as the cities of Beverly Hills, Santa Monica, and West Hollywood.

Los Angeles County – 4.95%
 Beverly Hills
 Santa Monica
 West Hollywood
 Los Angeles – 8.57%'''
 Cheviot Hills
 Hollywood
 East Hollywood
 Sawtelle
  West Los Angeles
 Westwood Village, Los Angeles

Election results from statewide races

List of Assembly Members 
Due to redistricting, the 51st district has been moved around different parts of the state. The current iteration resulted from the 2011 redistricting by the California Citizens Redistricting Commission.

Election results 1992 - present

2020

2018

2017 (special)

2016

2014

2012

2010

2008

2006

2004

2002

2000

1998

1996

1994

1992

See also 
 California State Assembly
 California State Assembly districts
 Districts in California

References

External links 
 District map from the California Citizens Redistricting Commission

51
Government of Los Angeles County, California
Government of Los Angeles
Eastside Los Angeles
Northeast Los Angeles
Chinatown, Los Angeles
Cypress Park, Los Angeles
Eagle Rock, Los Angeles
Echo Park, Los Angeles
Glassell Park, Los Angeles
Highland Park, Los Angeles
Montecito Heights, Los Angeles
Silver Lake, Los Angeles